Eric Lambert may refer to:

 Eric Lambert (author) (1918–1966), Australian author
 Eric Lambert (English footballer) (1920–1979), English footballer
 Eric Lambert (Belgian footballer) (1936–2020), Belgian footballer